Abraxas niphonibia is a species of moth belonging to the family Geometridae. It was described by Wehrli in 1935. It is known from Japan, Korea and the Kuriles.

The wingspan is 14–20 mm.

References

Abraxini
Moths of Asia
Moths described in 1935